Oriade is a Local Government area in the northeastern part of Osun State. It is predominantly occupied by the Ijesa people. Its capital is Ijebu-Jesa (or Ijebu Ijesha) in the north of the area at.

It has an area of 465 km and a population of 148,617 at the 2006 census.

The postal code of the area is 233.

The area covers various cities and towns, including parts of Ilesa, Ijebu-Jesa, Ipetu-Ijesha, Erinmo, Erin-Ijesa, Iloko, Ijeda, Iwaraja, Erin-oke, Ipo Arakeji, Ikeji-Arakeji, Ikeji-Ile, Ira-Ikeji, Orisunbare, Iwoye, Owena, Dagbaja, Omo-Ijesa, Ilo-Ayegunle, Ere, Eti-Oni, Apoti, Ijinmo etc.

There are tourists sites such as Oluminrin Water Falls among others 

Women in towns like Ipetu Ijesa, Ikeji Ile, Ipo Arakeji, Ikeji-Arakeji work are mat weavers. This is derived from local long grass called "Eni" in the local dialect.

Olashore International School is located in the area.

References

Local Government Areas in Osun State